Cockrell Hill is a city in Dallas County, Texas, United States. The population was 4,193 at the 2010 census, and 3,815 in 2020. It is completely surrounded by the city of Dallas.

History

Cockrell Hill was established by the pioneer Brentwood Allen Cockrell and his son, Woodrow. They established the town as a way of making a living, and ran it like a business. The Cockrell place was known to travelers on the stage line that ran from Dallas to Fort Belknap and on to El Paso and the west. The settlement developed as an agricultural crossroads and by the late 1800s had a few scattered homes, a small store, and a school. Water became the overriding issue for the town's continued growth. Frank Jester, a local developer, laid out the plan for the modern community of Cockrell Hill in 1911. A first attempt at incorporation in 1925 proved unsuccessful, and the following year a vote to disincorporate was approved. The second incorporation passed on July 21, 1937, when the population was 459. The town grew to a population of 1,246 in 1941. Many of the new residents worked in war-related industries located in the surrounding areas. In 1952 the population was 2,194, in 1990 it was 3,916, and in 2000 it was 4,445.In May 2006, Councilman Luis D. Carrera defeated C. P. Slayton and John Mendiola defeated Richard Hall and joined Silvia Ulloa, Richard Perez and Sammy Rodriquez to become the first all-Hispanic City Council in North Texas.

Geography
Cockrell Hill is located at  (32.738731, –96.889181).

Demographics

As of the 2020 United States census, there were 3,815 people, 1,160 households, and 965 families residing in the city.

Education

Primary and secondary schools 

Dallas Independent School District serves students in Cockrell Hill. All of the schools serving Cockrell Hill are in the City of Dallas.

, a portion is zoned to Celestino M. Soto, Jr. Elementary School, Stockard Middle School, and Moisés E. Molina High School. Parts of southern Cockrell Hill are served by L. O. Donald Elementary School, Zan Wesley Holmes Middle School, and Kimball High School. Parts of northern Cockrell Hill are served by Anson Jones Elementary School, Quintanilla Middle School, and Sunset High School.

Prior to May 2006 the attendance zones differed. Mary McLeod Bethune Elementary School, T. W. Browne Middle School, and Molina served one section. Jones, Quintanilla, and Molina served another section. Another part was served by Donald, Stockard, and Kimball. In 2006 Soto Elementary School opened, and the attendance boundaries shifted. In the fall of 2012, as Zan Holmes Middle School opened, it took the area in Cockrell Hill formerly zoned to T.W. Browne Middle School.

There is a private Catholic K–8 school adjacent to Cockrell Hill, Mount Saint Michael Catholic School, established in 1986 as Prince of Peace Christian School, renamed to in 1990 to Prince of Peace Community School and serving as a non-diocesan private school since 1995. It received its current name on July 1, 2007 to avoid confusion with other area schools with the same name.

Community colleges 

All of Dallas County (Cockrell Hill included) is in the service area of Dallas College (formerly Dallas County Community College). Dallas College operates Mountain View College, located near Cockrell Hill in Dallas.

Public safety 
Law enforcement is carried out by the Cockrell Hill Police Department, which employs paid and reserve sworn police officers.  The current (2014) police chief is Stephen Barlag.

The Cockrell Hill Police Department has suffered one line of duty death.  On May 30, 1999, Police Officer Tiffany Hickey died six days after she sustained injuries in a motor vehicle collision during pursuit of a suspect.  Officer Hickey was the passenger in the patrol car, being driven by her field training officer (FTO), when they attempted to stop a vehicle for speeding and running a red light.  Officer Hickey radioed dispatch to notify them of the chase but, due to an antiquated radio system, dispatch never heard the call because another officer was transmitting.  Approximately three minutes later the FTO swerved to avoid another vehicle in an intersection and struck a light pole.  Officer Hickey remained in serious condition before succumbing to her injuries.  Officer Hickey had served with the agency for only 1 month.

Fire safety is regulated by the all-volunteer Cockrell Hill Fire Department, which contracts its emergency ambulance services to the Dallas Fire Department.

Transportation 

Cockrell Hill can be reached by several bus lines in the Dallas Area Rapid Transit system. The main bus stop is the Cockrell Hill Transfer Location.

Endnotes

External links
 City of Cockrell Hill official website

Dallas–Fort Worth metroplex
Cities in Texas
Cities in Dallas County, Texas
Enclaves in the United States